Romain Arneodo (born 4 August 1992) is a French tennis player representing Monaco in competitions.

Career
Arneodo has won 1 ATP World Tour doubles title, 8 ATP Challenger Tour doubles titles as well as 1 ITF singles titles and 20 ITF doubles titles on the futures circuit. Arneodo has a career high ATP singles ranking of 455 achieved on 25 August 2014. He also has a career high ATP doubles ranking of 74 which was achieved on 28 October 2019.

Arneodo made his ATP main draw debut at the 2014 Monte-Carlo Rolex Masters in the doubles event partnering Benjamin Balleret. The pair had only received entry through a wildcard entrant and in the first round they defeated Jean-Julien Rojer and Horia Tecău 2–6, 6–3, [10–8]. In the second round they defeated the alternates Roberto Bautista Agut and Andreas Seppi 6–4, 3–6, [11–9]. Their run came to an end in the third round where they lost to the fifth seeds Daniel Nestor and Nenad Zimonjić 4–6, 3–6.

ATP World Tour career finals

Doubles: 2 (1 title, 1 runner-up)

Challenger and Futures Finals

Singles: 4 (1–3)

Doubles: 53 (32 titles, 21 runner-ups)

Doubles performance timeline

Current through the 2022 Davis Cup.

References

External links
 
 
 

1992 births
Living people
Monegasque male tennis players
Sportspeople from Cannes
People from Monte Carlo
French male tennis players